The World Cyber Games 2003 was held in Seoul, South Korea from the October 12th to the 18th. Approximately 600,000 competitors participated and 562 players advanced to the Grand Final. Total prize money was $2,000,000. It was the third iteration of the World Cyber Games.

Official games

PC Games

 Age of Mythology
 FIFA Soccer 2003
 HALF-LIFE: Counter-Strike
 StarCraft: Brood War
 Unreal Tournament 2003
 WarCraft III: Reign of Chaos

Console Games

 Halo

Results

External links
 WCG 2003 Overview

World Cyber Games events
2003 in esports
2003 in South Korean sport
Esports in South Korea